The Mark Steel Revolution was broadcast on BBC Radio 4 in 1998. Written and delivered by Mark Steel, each scripted lecture presents an informative, yet witty, account of a revolution. Many of the points are illustrated with readings by Martin Hyder and Carla Mendonça. The programme was produced by Phil Clarke.

Episode list
S01 E01 - The French Revolution (30 June 1998)
S01 E02 - The Sexual Revolution (7 July 1998)
S01 E03 - The Russian Revolution (14 July 1998)
S01 E04 - The Industrial Revolution (21 July 1998)
S01 E05 - The American Civil War (28 July 1998)
S01 E06 - The Evolution of Man (4 August 1998)

See also
The Mark Steel Lectures
The Mark Steel Solution
Mark Steel's in Town

BBC Radio comedy programmes
1998 radio programme debuts